Route 57 is a secondary state highway in western Connecticut serving as the "Main Street" of and connecting the towns of Westport and Weston. The road continues north through Redding to end at US 7 just after crossing into Wilton, in the neighborhood of Georgetown.

Route description

Route 57 begins  as Kings Highway North at the west bank of the Saugatuck River at an intersection with Route 33 north of downtown Westport. After crossing the river, it turns north onto Canal Street then onto Main Street. Route 57 then turns onto Weston Road as it intersects with the Merritt Parkway at an interchange (Exit 42). Continuing north, Route 57 crosses over the Aspetuck River and Saugatuck River before crossing into the town of Weston. Route 57 continues through Weston center, where it briefly overlaps Route 53. Past Weston center, the road becomes Georgetown Road and proceeds for another four miles (6 km) through Weston until it reaches Route 107 just across the town line in Redding. Route 57 then turns west along Route 107 (Redding Road and School Street), overlapping it for  into the Georgetown village of the town of Wilton. Routes 57 and 107 end concurrently at US 7 in Georgetown.

History 

Route 57 was commissioned in 1932 running from Westport center to Weston center, then along the old Newtown Turnpike to Newtown. The portion of the original route north of Weston center ran from the current northern intersection with Route 53 across Route 58 in Redding to an intersection the old US 202, now Route 302, in Newtown. In 1935, Route 57 was truncated to the intersection of the Newtown Turnpike at Route 58.  In 1954, the northern part of Route 57 was relocated to its current route along Georgetown Road towards Georgetown (former alignment of Route 53). The Newtown Turnpike portion of former Route 57 became unsigned SR 725, which was assigned in 1963 to a new alignment of Route 53.

Major intersections

References

057
Weston, Connecticut
Westport, Connecticut
Transportation in Fairfield County, Connecticut
Wilton, Connecticut